Innocence is a lack of guilt, with respect to any kind of crime, or wrongdoing. In a legal context, innocence is to the lack of legal guilt of an individual, with respect to a crime. In other contexts, it is a lack of experience.

In relation to knowledge
Innocence can imply lesser experience in either a relative view to social peers, or by an absolute comparison to a more common normative scale.  In contrast to ignorance, it is generally viewed as a positive term, connoting an optimistic view of the world, in particular one where the lack of knowledge stems from a lack of wrongdoing, whereas greater knowledge comes from doing wrong. Subjects such as crime and sexuality may be especially considered. This connotation may be connected with a popular false etymology explaining "innocent" as meaning "not knowing" (Latin noscere (To know, learn)). The actual etymology is from general negation prefix in- and the Latin nocere, "to harm".

People who lack the mental capacity to understand the nature of their acts may be regarded as innocent regardless of their behavior. From this meaning comes the usage of innocent as a noun to refer to a child under the age of reason, or a person, of any age, who is severely mentally disabled. 

Nonetheless, the word "innocence" is used to describe childhood innocence as a notion created and controlled by adults. As Jean-Jacques Rousseau describes 'childhood as a time of innocence' where children are 'not-knowing' and must reach the age of reason to become competent people in society. However, this is not the case anymore as technology advances, this has given children in the contemporary world a platform where they are referred to as 'digital natives', where they appear to be more knowledgeable in some areas than adults.

Pejorative meaning
In some cases, the term "innocence" has a pejorative meaning, where an assumed level of experience dictates common discourse or baseline qualifications for entry into another, different, social experience. Since experience is a prime factor in determining a person's point of view, innocence is often also used to imply naivety or lack of personal experience.

Symbolism
 
The lamb is a commonly used symbol of innocence's nature. In Christianity, for example, Jesus is referred to as the "Lamb of God", thus emphasizing his sinless nature. Other symbols of innocence include children, virgins, acacia branches (especially in Freemasonry), non-sexual nudity, songbirds and the color white (biblical paintings and Hollywood films depict Jesus wearing a white tunic).

Loss of innocence
A "loss of innocence" is a common theme in fiction, pop culture, and realism. It is often seen as an integral part of coming of age. It is usually thought of as an experience or period in a person's life that leads to a greater awareness of evil, pain and/or suffering in the world around them. Examples of this theme include songs like "American Pie", poetry like William Blake's collection Songs of Innocence and of Experience, novels like To Kill a Mockingbird, The Catcher in the Rye, A Farewell to Arms, and Lord of the Flies, and films like Viridiana, The 400 Blows, and Stand By Me.

By contrast, the I Ching urges a recovery of innocence - the name given to Hexagram 25 - and "encourages you to actively practice innocence".

Innocence could also be viewed as a Westernized view of childhood, and the "loss" of innocence is simply a social construction or viewed as the dominant ideology. Thinkers such as Jean-Jaques Rousseau used the romanticism discourse as a way to separate children from adults. Ideas surrounding childhood and childhood innocence stem from this discourse.

In psychoanalysis
The psychoanalytic tradition is broadly divided between those (like Fairbairn and Winnicott) who saw the child as initially innocent, but liable to lose its innocence under the impact of stress or psychological trauma; and those (like Freud and Klein) who see the child as developing innocence - maturing into it - as a result of surmounting the Oedipus complex and/or the depressive position.

More eclectically, Eric Berne saw the Child ego state, and its vocabulary, as reflecting three different possibilities: the cliches of conformity; the obscenities of revolt; and "the sweet phrases of charming innocence". In a rather different formulation, Christopher Bollas used the term 'Violent Innocence' to describe a fixed and obdurate refusal to acknowledge the existence of an alternative viewpoint - something akin to what he calls "the fascist construction, the outcome is to empty the mind of all opposition".

Literary sidelights
In The Golden Notebook, a woman looks back in laughing envy at the innocence that had previously allowed her to submerge herself in the position of the 'woman-in-love'.
Ivy Compton-Burnett had one character conclude dourly of another two that "you are both of you innocent though it is an innocence rooted in your wishes for your own lives".

See also
Beginner's mind
Ingénue
Three wise monkeys
Naivety
Gullibility
Fig leaf covering

References

Religious belief and doctrine
Legal terminology
Psychoanalytic theory